Phạm Thị Tươi (born 26 June 1993) is a Vietnamese footballer who plays as a defender for Women's Championship club Phong Phú Hà Nam and the Vietnam women's national team.

References

1993 births
Living people
Women's association football defenders
Vietnamese women's footballers
Vietnam women's international footballers
Footballers at the 2018 Asian Games
Asian Games competitors for Vietnam
21st-century Vietnamese women